WWF Road to WrestleMania is a video game released on the Game Boy Advance handheld console by THQ, based on the World Wrestling Federation's pay-per-view of the same name. It was the first WWF game to be released on the Game Boy Advance, and the only one released under the WWF name, as the promotion was renamed in 2002. The main part of the game is the season mode where players have to win matches to get a heavyweight championship title match.

The game was succeeded by WWE Road to WrestleMania X8.

Gameplay
The game features both singleplayer and multiplayer game modes, with multiplayer being available through the Game Boy Advance Gamelink cable. The singleplayer game modes have a variety of match types including Exhibition, Gauntlet, Season, King of the Ring, Royal Rumble, Iron Man, and Pay Per View. Due to memory and roster limit restrictions,  the Royal Rumble game mode is limited only to a maximum of 24 participants, compared to the average of 30 in its real-life variant. The season mode is incredibly similar to career modes found in other sports and wrestling games alike, which involves the player choosing a wrestler and building their career with the end goal of reaching WrestleMania, WWE's premier event of the year. Every week the player is subjected to various matches against the other competing wrestlers on the roster.

Roster

Reception

The game received "mixed" reviews according to video game review aggregator Metacritic.

See also
 List of licensed wrestling video games
 List of fighting games

References

2001 video games
Game Boy Advance games
Game Boy Advance-only games
Natsume (company) games
THQ games
Video games developed in Japan
WrestleMania video games
WWE video games
Multiplayer and single-player video games
Professional wrestling games